Governor's Palace is a proposed government building in Chandigarh, India. The building was designed by Le Corbusier, with help from Pierre Jeanneret, a Swiss architect and Corbusier's cousin, but it wasn't built.

A model of the building was on display at the Le Corbusier Centre, Zürich, Switzerland and Chandigarh Architecture Museum, Sector 10, Chandigarh. Planning and development of the city of Chandigarh is considered a unique experiment of the modern independent India.

References

Le Corbusier buildings in India
Proposed buildings and structures in India